Chilades, commonly called jewel blues, is a genus of butterflies in the family Lycaenidae. The species of this genus are found in the Old World and in Australia.

Species
Listed alphabetically:

Chilades alberta (Butler, 1901) [now viewed as a species of Euchrysops]
Chilades eleusis (Demaison, 1888)
Chilades elicola (Strand, 1911)
Chilades evorae Libert, Baliteau & Baliteau, 2011 - Cape Verde (Santo Antão)
Chilades kedonga (Grose-Smith, 1898)
Chilades lajus or Chilades laius (Stoll, [1780]) – lime blue
Chilades naidina (Butler, [1886])
Chilades parrhasius (Fabricius, 1793) – Indian Cupid
Chilades roemli Kalis, 1933 Java
Chilades saga Grose-Smith, 1895 Timor
Chilades serrula (Mabille, 1890)
Chilades yunnanensis Watkins, 1927 southwest China

Following recent molecular studies, several species that were previously included in Chilades have been moved to Freyeria and Luthrodes.

Gallery

References

External links

 
Lycaenidae genera
Taxa named by Frederic Moore